was a village located in  Isawa District, Iwate Prefecture, Japan. It is currently part of the city of Ōshū.

The village of Koromogawa was created on April 1, 1889, with the establishment of the municipalities system. On February 20, 2006, Koromogawa, along with the cities of Esashi and Mizusawa, and the towns of Isawa and Maesawa (both from Isawa District), was merged to create the city of Ōshū, and no longer exists as an independent municipality.

As of February 2006, the village had an estimated population of 4,954 and a population density of 30.29 persons per km². The total area was 163.57 km².

External links
 Ōshū official website 

Dissolved municipalities of Iwate Prefecture
Ōshū, Iwate